Roberto Gervasini (born 25 June 1947) is a former Italian male long-distance runner who competed at one edition of the IAAF World Cross Country Championships at senior level (1974), and won two national championships at senior level (two national indoor championships) in 1970 and 1975 on the 1500 m.

References

External links
 

1947 births
Living people
Italian male middle-distance runners
Italian male long-distance runners